Akif Çağatay Kılıç (born 15 June 1976) is a Turkish educator, politician, an MP for Samsun Province of the ruling Justice and Development Party (AKP), and the former Minister of Youth and Sports of Turkey.

In September 2016, Kılıç was involved in controversy when after an interview with Michel Friedman on DW-TV's "Conflict Zone", the Turkish government seized the recording.  In September 2016, Deutsche Welle filed a lawsuit against Turkish Sports Ministry over the seized interview.

Early life
Akif Çağatay Kılıç was born on 15 June 1976 to Sinan Kılıç and Behire Yıldız in Siegen, North Rhine-Westphalia, West Germany.

His grandfather İlyas Kılıç was a politician of the Republican People's Party (CHP), who served five consecutive times as MP between 1961 and 1980. His father Sinan Kılıç served as a private physician of Recep Tayyip Erdoğan during his office time as the Mayor of Istanbul in the 1990s.

He studied Political Science at University of Hertfordshire in the United Kingdom. He attended further studies in Economy of Europe.

Çağatay Kılıç is married to Eda Kılıç, and they have two daughters, Ela and Ece.

Career

Profession
He worked in the purchasing department of Sabancı Holding's Universal Trading Company in the UK. Returned to Turkey, he was appointed advisor in the headquarters of the Justice and Development Party (AKP) in 2003.

Later, Çağatay Kılıç served as advisor and assistant principal clerk of Prime Minister Recep Tayyip Erdoğan.

Politics
Kılıç entered active politics running for a seat in the Grand National Assembly of Turkey in the 2011 general election, and was elected as an MP of Samsun Province from the AKP. He was appointed a member of the Turkish group at the NATO Parliamentary Assembly.

On 26 December 2013, Çağatay Kılıç assumed office as the Minister of Youth and Sports, succeeding Suat Kılıç during Erdoğan's cabinet reshuffle with ten new names that was announced the day before, on 25 December, following the 2013 corruption scandal in Turkey.

At the age of 37, he became the youngest member of the cabinet.

References

1976 births
People from Siegen
Deutsche Schule Istanbul alumni
Alumni of the University of Hertfordshire
Turkish expatriates in the United Kingdom
Justice and Development Party (Turkey) politicians
Deputies of Samsun
Ministers of Youth and Sports of Turkey
Living people
Members of the 26th Parliament of Turkey
Members of the 25th Parliament of Turkey
Members of the 24th Parliament of Turkey
Members of the 65th government of Turkey
Members of the 64th government of Turkey
Members of the 63rd government of Turkey
Recipients of the Cross of the Order of Merit of the Federal Republic of Germany